The 2019–20 season was VVV-Venlo's 115th season in existence and the club's 12th consecutive season in the top flight of Dutch football. In addition to the domestic league, VVV-Venlo participated in this season's edition of the KNVB Cup. The season covered the period from 1 July 2019 to 30 June 2020.

Players

Current squad

Pre-season and friendlies

Competitions

Overview

Eredivisie

League table

Results summary

Results by round

Matches
The Eredivisie schedule was announced on 14 June 2019. The 2019–20 season was abandoned on 24 April 2020, due to the coronavirus pandemic in the Netherlands.

KNVB Cup

References

External links

VVV-Venlo seasons
VVV-Venlo